The Great Adventure is a 2005 Hong Kong modern serial drama starring Francis Ng, Dayo Wong and Flora Chan. It was produced by One Dollar Production and was aired on ATV Home from 5 December 2005 to 22 January 2006. This series tells about the changes in Hong Kong between the 1970s and 1990s.

Cast

Main cast

Other cast

External links
  Official page on ATV's website

Asia Television original programming
Hong Kong action television series
2005 Hong Kong television series debuts
2006 Hong Kong television series endings
2000s Hong Kong television series